Princess 'Maseeiso Mohato Seeiso (born 20 November 2004) is a princess of Lesotho, the second child of King Letsie III of Lesotho and his wife Queen 'Masenate Mohato Seeiso.

She was born at Maseru Private Hospital in Maseru, the capital of Lesotho. Women are prohibited under law from ruling in Lesotho, so neither 'Maseeiso nor her older sister Senate are eligible; their younger brother Lerotholi is the heir apparent. There has been some support recently for this law to change, however.

Ancestry

References

2004 births
Living people
Lesotho Christians
Lesotho royalty
House of Moshesh
People from Maseru
Royal children
Daughters of kings